Sailor Moon, originally released in Japan as  and later as Pretty Guardian Sailor Moon, is a Japanese superhero anime television series produced by Toei Animation using Super Sentai motifs. It is based on the manga of the same title written by Naoko Takeuchi that was published from 1991 to 1997 in Nakayoshi. Sailor Moon first aired in Japan on TV Asahi from March 7, 1992, to February 8, 1997, and was dubbed for release in various regions around the world, including North America, Southeast Asia, Greater China, Australia, Europe, and Latin America.

The series follows the adventures of the titular protagonist whose name is Usagi Tsukino, a middle school student who is given the power to become the Pretty Soldier. She also founds other Sailor Soldiers to team up, she defends Earth against an assortment of evil villains. The anime also parallels the maturation of Usagi from an emotional middle school girl to a responsible young adult.

Due to the success of the anime in the United States, the manga comprising its story was released by Tokyopop. Sailor Moons popularity has spawned numerous additional media based on its universe, including films, video games, and soundtracks. A second animated adaptation, Sailor Moon Crystal, which is a reboot series that more closely follows the manga, began streaming worldwide from July 2014 onward.

Plot

Sailor Moon (1992–1993)

A 14-year-old underachieving young  schoolgirl named Usagi Tsukino meets a magical talking cat named Luna. Luna gives Usagi the ability to transform into a magical alter ego — Sailor Moon — tasked with locating the moon princess and battling the evil forces of the Dark Kingdom. When Usagi transforms for the first time into her magical sailor suit with Luna's help, she overreacts and reluctantly accepts her fate, not sure what has happened to her. At the time she does not know the enemies she will face, the friends she will make, or the experiences ahead of her. As she moves forward, she accepts her fate, and realizes the importance of fighting evil.

The Dark Kingdom — led by Queen Beryl — summons various monsters called Youma in order to sap energy from humans and feed it to an evil entity known as Queen Metaria.
As Usagi battles against the Dark Kingdom, she is joined by other girls also awakening as Sailor Soldiers: the timid but intelligent Ami Mizuno (Sailor Mercury), the hot-headed miko Rei Hino (Sailor Mars), the tomboyish but romantic Makoto Kino (Sailor Jupiter), and the aspiring idol Minako Aino (Sailor Venus). Minako is joined by Artemis, her feline advisor and Luna's partner. The Sailor Soldiers are often supported by the mysterious Tuxedo Mask whose civilian form is Mamoru Chiba, a college student with whom Usagi eventually becomes romantically involved.

After continually thwarting the Dark Kingdom and defeating several of its generals, Usagi awakens as the moon princess — Princess Serenity — and acquires the Silver Crystal. However, Mamoru is captured by the Dark Kingdom and brainwashed into working for them. The Sailor Soldiers learn of their past lives on Silver Millennium, an ancient kingdom on the moon. There, they served as Serenity's friends and bodyguards, and Serenity was in love with a prince from Earth named Endymion (Mamoru's past identity). However, the Dark Kingdom attacked and destroyed Silver Millennium, resulting in the deaths of Serenity, Endymion, and the Sailor Soldiers. Serenity's mother — Queen Serenity — used the power of the Silver Crystal to vanquish Queen Metaria and end the war. She also used the crystal to send the fallen Sailor Soldiers into the future to be reborn on Earth, hoping to give them a second chance at peace.

The Sailor Soldiers eventually pinpoint the location of the Dark Kingdom at the North Pole and travel there. However, Usagi's friends are killed trying to protect her from Queen Beryl's most powerful monsters, the DD Girls. Usagi faces the brainwashed Mamoru alone and frees him from Queen Beryl’s control. However, Mamoru is killed protecting Usagi while also striking down Queen Beryl. Using the Silver Crystal, she then faces Queen Beryl (who has fused with Queen Metaria) as Princess Serenity, defeating her with the help of the fallen Sailor Soldiers' spirits and the Silver Crystal's power. Usagi dies afterwards, but she is able to use the last of the Silver Crystal's power to resurrect herself, the Sailor Soldiers and Mamoru with one wish that they all get to live normal lives again. Everything on Earth is returned to normal, and no one (but Artemis and Luna) retain any memories of these events.

Sailor Moon R (1993–1994)

Some time later, a pair of extraterrestrials named Ail and Ann descend onto Earth with the Hell Tree which feeds on human energy. Ail and Ann summon monsters from cards — called Cardians — to prey on humans. In order to defend against these attacks, Luna restores the Sailor Soldiers' memories. Eventually, Ail and Ann are defeated, see the error of their ways, and return to space with the Makai Tree. During these events, Mamoru is able to reclaim his lost memories and begins a romantic relationship with Usagi. Shortly after these events, a pink-haired girl named Chibiusa falls from the sky, revealing that she traveled from the future in order to find the Silver Crystal and use it to save her parents. She is followed by the Black Moon Clan, a new enemy force that is trying to kill her. Eventually, the Sailor Soldiers and Tuxedo Mask travel with Chibiusa to the future where Usagi rules Crystal Tokyo as Neo-Queen Serenity. They learn that Chibiusa is actually Usagi and Mamoru's future daughter, and they also meet Sailor Pluto who guards the Door of Space-Time. Eventually, the Sailor Soldiers battle against Wiseman, a dark force that was manipulating the Black Moon Clan with the goal of destroying Earth. Chibiusa is able to summon the Silver Crystal of the future and aids in the destruction of Wiseman. Afterwards, Chibiusa returns to her own time, now freed from the Black Moon Clan's corruption.

Sailor Moon S (1994–1995)

Some time later, the Sailor Soldiers encounter the Death Busters, an evil organization that is summoning monsters called Daimons to steal Heart Crystals from humans. Their intention is to locate three specific Heart Crystals that contain special Talismans. Joining the Sailor Soldiers are Haruka Tenoh and Michiru Kaioh, who operate as Sailor Uranus and Sailor Neptune respectively. The two are also seeking the Talismans for different purposes and come into conflict with the other Sailor Soldiers. Sailor Pluto returns to the present day as Setsuna Meioh; Chibiusa also returns, now donning her own magical girl identity of Sailor Chibi Moon.

The Death Busters eventually discover that Haruka and Michiru hold two of the Talismans and acquire them at the cost of their lives, but Setsuna — who holds the third — revives them. The Talismans create the Holy Grail, allowing Usagi to acquire a second form: Super Sailor Moon. The Death Busters' intentions then change to harvesting Heart Crystals en masse to resurrect the malevolent entity known as Mistress 9. Chibiusa also befriends a sickly girl named Hotaru, unaware that she is the daughter of the Death Busters' leader, Professor Tomoe. Unknown to her, Hotaru is also Sailor Saturn, a Sailor Soldier capable of destroying and rebirthing entire planets. Haruka, Michiru and Setsuna fear that Saturn's awakening will result in Earth's destruction and plead for Usagi to kill her.

Mistress 9 is revealed to have been residing within Hotaru's body and awakens upon stealing Chibiusa's Heart Crystal. The Sailor Soldiers go to Mugen Academy to stop the Death Busters and save Chibiusa, Hotaru, & the world. Sailor Moon is the only one who is able to enter the academy thanks to Mistress 9, and Pluto sacrifices her life to save Uranus and Neptune who are able to make it in the academy as well. The other Sailor Soldiers erect a barrier to keep the enemy from destroying the city and the world. Mistress 9 then tricks Usagi into handing over the Holy Grail, allowing her to summon Pharaoh 90 to destroy the Earth. Hotaru awakens as Sailor Saturn, destroys Mistress 9, and intends to sacrifice herself to stop Pharaoh 90, but Usagi is able to activate her Super form to destroy Pharaoh 90 and rescue Hotaru. Afterwards, Hotaru is reborn as a baby and returned to her father, now freed from the influence of the Death Busters. Uranus and Neptune then challenge Usagi to a fight to prove to them and everyone that she is the true Messiah and the future queen of Silver Millennium. After the fight, they both acknowledge her as their queen and leave the city knowing their mission is now over and that it is in safe hands. Following this, Chibiusa receives a letter from her parents from the future wanting her to return home. She returns briefly, but soon travels back to the 20th century to help the Sailor Soldiers and Tuxedo Mask defeat the last Daimon monster, and decides to stay in the present a bit longer.

Sailor Moon SuperS (1995–1996)

Chibiusa remains in the present day to train as a Sailor Soldier. She meets an alicorn named Pegasus who forms a secret relationship with her through her dreams. Pegasus also aids the Sailor Soldiers by upgrading them to permanent Super forms and lending his power when summoned by Chibiusa. The new powers are used to combat the Dead Moon Circus, a mysterious circus troupe that targets humans with beautiful dreams. By looking into their Dream Mirrors, they hope to find the dream in which Pegasus is hiding, believing Pegasus possesses the Golden Crystal. With this crystal, the Dead Moon Circus's ruler — Queen Nehelenia — can be freed from the mirror she was sealed in.

Queen Nehelenia was once a queen of her own kingdom that was absorbed by vanity. In fear of losing her beauty, she consumed the dreams of her subjects to stay young. She sought the Golden Crystal in the possession of a priest named Helios (Pegasus's true form) and was sealed within a mirror by Queen Serenity as a result. Queen Nehelenia formed the Dead Moon Circus and used Zirconia as a proxy to track Pegasus down. Although she obtains the Golden Crystal, she is betrayed by the Amazoness Quartet who gives the crystal to Chibiusa. Using the crystal, Queen Nehelenia is defeated and begins to wither with age, forcing her back into the mirror she was once sealed within. Helios returns to his home realm of Elysion.

Much unlike the manga, the four Sailor Guardians of the Outer Planets- Haruka Tenoh, Michiru Kaioh, Setsuna Meioh and Hotaru Tomoe, do not make any appearances nor are they mentioned or referenced.

Sailor Moon Sailor Stars (1996–1997)

Queen Nehelenia returns when Sailor Galaxia frees her and encourages her to seek revenge against the Sailor Soldiers especially Sailor Moon. The Outer Sailor Soldiers: Uranus, Neptune, Pluto, & Saturn return in their now Super forms to help out, Queen Nehelenia then places a curse on the mirrors throughout the city and affects almost everyone and she then targets Mamoru who is also affected by the curse and that will ultimately kill him and erase Chibiusa from existence. The Sailor Soldiers enter Queen Nehelenia's nightmare dimension to stop her. Usagi eventually comes to pity Queen Nehelenia's plight and is able to rid her of her negativity by activating her final form, Eternal Sailor Moon.

Shortly after these events, Mamoru leaves for the United States to study abroad while Usagi and her friends enter high school. Chibiusa also returns to her own time. A group of enemies called the Sailor Animamates — led by Sailor Galaxia — begin targeting humans for their Star Seeds (which serve as a human's life force). Usagi is also aided by the Sailor Starlights — Kou Seiya (Sailor Star Fighter), Kou Taiki (Sailor Star Maker), and Kou Yaten (Sailor Star Healer) — who disguise themselves as an idol group named the Three Lights. The Starlights are searching for their ruler, Princess Kakyuu. A young girl — nicknamed Chibi Chibi because of her limited vocabulary that usually involves the word "chibi" — also appears and begins living with Usagi.

Sailor Galaxia's past is eventually revealed. She once ended the Sailor Wars by sealing Chaos — the source of all malice — within her body. Unable to resist Chaos's influence, she separated her Star Seed from her body, and it took the form of Chibi Chibi. Sailor Galaxia steals the Star Seeds of Princess Kakyuu and all Usagi's companions, resulting in their deaths. This also includes Mamoru who was targeted and killed before he arrived in the United States. Chibi Chibi transforms into the Sword of Sealing and urges Usagi to kill Sailor Galaxia. However, Usagi instead uses the kindness in her own heart to free Sailor Galaxia of Chaos' corruption, effectively resurrecting all of the Sailor Soldiers, Princess Kakyuu, & Mamoru whose Star Seeds were taken. Normalcy is restored, and Mamoru and Usagi share a kiss under a full moon.

Production and broadcasting

Naoko Takeuchi initially planned both the Sailor Moon manga and anime to only run for one season. Due to the season's popularity, Toei Animation asked Takeuchi to continue drawing her manga, but she initially struggled with developing another storyline to extend the series. At the suggestion of her editor, Fumio Osano, Takeuchi decided that the second season would focus on introducing Sailor Moon's daughter from the future. To give Takeuchi time to write the Black Moon story arc, the anime team developed a filler arc known as Makai (Lit. Hell''') Tree arc.Sailor Moon is adapted from the 52 chapters of the series which was published in Nakayoshi from 1991–97. The first season is directed by Junichi Satō with Kazuko Tadano as a character designer. For the second season, Sato directed the Makai Tree arc while Kunihiko Ikuhara directed the Black Moon arc. The third and fourth seasons are directed by Ikuhara with Ikuko Itoh taking the role of character designer starting from the third season. The fifth and final season was directed by Takuya Igarashi and Katsumi Tamegai is the next person to be the character designer. It premiered in Japan on TV Asahi on March 7, 1992, taking over the timeslot previously held by Goldfish Warning!, and ran for 200 episodes until its conclusion on February 8 five years later.

Because the manga was often published during the anime's production, the anime would only lag the manga by a month or two. As a result, "the anime follows the storyline of the manga fairly closely, although there are deviations." Takeuchi has stated that due to Toei's largely male production staff, she feels that the anime version has "a slight male perspective."Sailor Moon sparked a highly successful merchandising campaign of over 5,000 items which contributed to demand internationally and translation into numerous languages. Sailor Moon has since become one of the most famous anime properties in the world. Due to its resurgence of popularity in Japan, the series was rebroadcast on September 1, 2009. The series also began rebroadcasting in Italy in Autumn next year, receiving permission from Naoko Takeuchi, who released new artwork to promote its return.Pretty Soldier Sailor Moon consists of five separate seasons: Sailor Moon, Sailor Moon R, Sailor Moon S, Sailor Moon SuperS, and Sailor Moon Sailor Stars. The seasons each roughly correspond to one of the five major story arcs of the manga, following the same general storyline and including most of the same characters. Toei also developed five special animated shorts. The anime series was sold as 20 volumes in Japan. By the end of 1995, each volume had sold approximately 300,000 copies.

English dub production and broadcast
In 1995, after a bidding war with Toon Makers & Renaissance-Atlantic Entertainment, who wanted to produce an American live-action/animated hybrid adaptation, DIC Productions, L.P. (now Wildbrain), SeaGull Entertainment and Sachs Finley Media, licensed the first two seasons of Sailor Moon for an English-language release in North America. The Mississauga-based Optimum Productions was hired to dub the anime. Bob Summers wrote a new background score. DIC had mandated cuts to content and length, which reduced the first 89 episodes by seven. Their adaptation was created to capitalize on the success of Mighty Morphin Power Rangers.

The series premiered in Canada on August 28, 1995 on YTV and in first-run syndication in the U.S. on September 11, but halted production in November 1995 after two seasons due to low ratings. Despite moderate success in Canada, the U.S. airing struggled in early morning "dead" timeslots; the series originally aired in the U.S. in morning and afternoon timeslots which Anne Allison describes as unsuitable for the target audience. In contrast, due to the dubbing process being done in Canada, the series was considered Canadian enough to be screened in primetime as local content. After the series was cancelled, a fan petition that garnered over 12,500 signatures was created. It caught the attention of General Mills, who, in 1997, agreed to sponsor and syndicate the Sailor Moon dub through The Program Exchange. This was later considered an early example of successful fan activism.  On June 9, 1997, re-runs of this cancelled dub began airing on USA Network. That same year, production on the series' English dub was resumed with the last 17 episodes of the second season, Sailor Moon R, and was broadcast in Canada from September 20 to November 21, 1997 to wrap up lingering plot lines.
On June 1, 1998, reruns of the series began airing on Cartoon Network's weekday afternoon programming block, Toonami. Due to the ratings success of these reruns, the remaining seventeen episodes (promoted as "The Lost Episodes"), also began airing on November 30. In 1999, Cloverway Inc. once again contracted Optimum Productions to produce English-language adaptations of Sailor Moon S and SuperS with Pioneer Entertainment handling home video distribution. This dub featured less censorship and was first broadcast on YTV in Canada and later on Toonami in the United States. The dub finished airing on Toonami on September 13, 2002..

Due to the series' resurgence of popularity in Japan, re-runs of the Sailor Moon series began on September 1, 2009 on Animax. In 2010, Toei negotiated to license and broadcast Sailor Moon in Italy on Mediaset (Canale 5, Rete 4), resulting in an international revival. Later, Toei licensed Sailor Moon episodes to countries which the show has not been aired before. On May 16, 2014, North American manga and anime distributor Viz Media announced that it had acquired the Sailor Moon anime series, as well as the three films and specials for an English-language release in North America, allowing Viz to restore the removed content from the first 89 episodes. The Studio City, Los Angeles-based Studiopolis was also hired by Viz to re-dub the entire series. The series began streaming in the United States on Neon Alley and Hulu on May 19, 2014, and in Canada, with Japanese audio on Tubi TV on July 15, 2016 and with English audio on Crave on September 18, 2020. On November 28, 2014, Australian manga and anime publisher Madman Entertainment announced that they had re-acquired the rights to the "Sailor Moon" anime series for Australia & New Zealand and will release the series in uncut format with the Viz Media English adaptation in 2015. Madman had previously held the Australian licence for Sailor Moon on VHS & DVD.

EditingSailor Moons original North American release was the subject of heavy editing which resulted in large amounts of removed content and alterations that greatly changed the original work. These changes altered almost every aspect of the show including character names, clothing, scenes and dialogue. Some scenes with brief nudity and bathing were also censored, and any type of violence including violence against children was also removed. Homosexual characters, including Zoisite, Fisheye, Kunzite, and Sailors Uranus and Neptune were also altered, with the first two's gender changed from male to female, and Uranus and Neptune being explained as cousins rather than lovers. Changing evil characters' genders to female also had the side effect of creating more diverse female characterizations, as the evil female characters now did not have the same body type.

Viz Media's release restores all of the content that was cut from the original Japanese version, including scenes that were censored by Optimum Productions at the request of DiC and Cloverway.

Music

Takanori Arisawa composed the score for Pretty Soldier Sailor Moon. Arisawa earned the Golden Disk Grand Prize from Columbia Records for his work on the first series soundtrack in 1993. In 1998, 2000, and 2001 Arisawa won three consecutive JASRAC International Awards for most international royalties, owing largely to the popularity of Sailor Moon music in other nations.

The first opening theme, was used for the first 166 episodes, being performed by DALI for the first two seasons and then by Moon Lips for the next two seasons. The second opening theme, for the remaining episodes, is "Sailor Star Song" performed by Kae Hanazawa. The last ending theme, used for the series finale at episode 200, is Moon Lips's version of "Moonlight Densetsu".

The DiC/Cloverway/Optimum English adaptation of the anime series used the melody of "Moonlight Densetsu" with very different English lyrics. At the time, it was unusual for anime theme songs to be translated, and this was one of the first such themes to be redone in English since Star Blazers. The English theme has been described as "inane but catchy". The Japanese theme is a love song based on the relationship between Usagi and Mamoru ("born on the same Earth"), whereas the English Sailor Moon theme rather resembles a superhero anthem.

"Moonlight Densetsu" was released as a CD single in March 1992, and was an "explosive hit." "Moonlight Densetsu" won first place in the Song category in Animage's 15th and 16th Anime Grand Prix. It came seventh in the 17th Grand Prix, and "Moon Revenge" from Sailor Moon R: The Movie, came eighth. Rashiku Ikimasho, the second closing song for SuperS, placed eighteenth in 1996. In 1997, "Sailor Star Song", the new opening theme for Sailor Stars, came eleventh, and "Moonlight Densetsu" came sixteenth.

Related media
Home releases
In Japan, Sailor Moon received VHS releases during its run. The first VHS was released on July 25, 1993. Sailor Moon did not receive a DVD release until 2002. Mass-produced individual six-episode DVDs were released beginning on May 21, 2002. On January 25, 2017, the Blu-ray collection of the series was released from June 14 during the franchise's 25th anniversary as Pretty Guardian Sailor Moon, and each seasons consisted 23 episodes per volume.

In 2014, Viz Media announced plans to release the series in both Blu-ray Disc and DVD format, with the first set released on November 11, 2014. In addition, the first twenty-three episodes of their redub premiered on the streaming sites, Hulu and Neon Alley, beginning September 5, 2014. The first part of season one was released on DVD and Limited Edition Blu-ray on November 11, 2014 and the second part was released on February 10, 2015.

The last part of the anime series was released on November 12, 2019.

Films
During the series' broadcast run, three theatrical animated Sailor Moon films were produced: Sailor Moon R: The Movie (1993), Sailor Moon S: The Movie (1994), and Sailor Moon SuperS: The Movie (1995). The films were released in December to line up with the winter vacations of Japanese schools. They were typically double features paired up with other anime films, and were thus usually an hour or less in length. Each film features an original story that takes place during the season it is based on.

Reception and legacy
Originally planned to run for only six months, the Sailor Moon anime continued due to its popularity, concluding after a five-year run. In Japan, it aired every Saturday night in prime time at 7 p.m. and its run there was very popular, with an average viewer rating of 11–12% for most of the series run. Commentators detect in the anime adaptation of Sailor Moon "a more shonen tone", appealing to a wider audience than the manga, which aimed squarely at teenage girls. The media franchise became one of the most successful Japan has ever had, reaching $1.5 billion in merchandise sales during the first three years. Ten years after the series completion, the series featured among the top thirty of TV Asahi Top 100 anime polls in 2005 and 2006. The anime series won the Animage Anime Grand Prix prize in 1993. Sales of Sailor Moon fashion dolls overtook those of Licca-chan in the 1990s; Mattel attributed this to the "fashion-action" blend of the Sailor Moon storyline. Doll accessories included both fashion items and the Sailor Soldiers' weapons. The first season holds an approval rating of 90% on review aggregator Rotten Tomatoes, based on ten reviews. The site's consensus reads "Powerfully feminine and hypnotically cheesy, Sailor Moon's iconic anime still sparkles after all these years." Sailor Moon has also become popular internationally. Spain and France became the first countries outside Japan to air Sailor Moon, beginning in December 1993. Other countries followed suit, including South Korea, the Philippines (Sailor Moon became one of ABC (now 5)'s main draws, helping it to become the third-biggest network in the country), Poland, Russia, Italy, the Czech Republic, Mexico, Brazil, Ukraine, Belarus, Sweden, Germany, Bulgaria, Austria, Indonesia, Croatia, Hungary, Taiwan, Thailand, Romania and Hong Kong, before North America picked up the franchise for adaptation. In 2001, the Sailor Moon manga was Tokyopop's best selling property, outselling the next-best selling titles by at least a factor of 1.5.

Critics have commended the anime series for its portrayal of strong friendships as well as for its large cast of "strikingly different" characters who have different dimensions and aspects to them as the story continues and for an ability to appeal to a wide audience. Writer Nicolas Penedo attributes the success of Sailor Moon to its fusion of the shōjo manga genre of magical girls with the Saint Seiya fighting teams. According to Martha Cornog and Timothy Perper, Sailor Moon became popular because of its "strongly-plotted action with fight scenes, rescues" and its "emphasis on feelings and relationships", including some "sexy romance" between Usagi and Mamoru. Usagi and Mamoru's romance has been seen as an archetype where the lovers "become more than the sum of their parts", promising to be together forever. In contrast, others see Sailor Moon as campy and melodramatic. Criticism has singled out its use of formulaic plots, monsters of the day and stock footage.

Screen Rant called the anime "partly revolutionary for how it depicted its heroines" as it featured women who were "distinct because of their personalities," while AfterEllen said that the anime "features the best-known yuri relationship in history" between Sailor Uranus and Sailor Neptune. Yuricon said that the relationship could be described as butch-femme
 and CBR called their relationship one of the most beloved, and complex, in the series.

Patrick Drazen states that Sailor Moon has two kinds of villains, the "monster of the day" and the "thinking, feeling humans." Although this is common in anime and manga, it is "almost unheard of in the West." Despite the series' apparent popularity among Western anime fandom, the dubbed version of the series received poor ratings in the United States when it was initially broadcast in syndication and did not do well in DVD sales in the United Kingdom. Anne Allison attributes the lack of popularity in the United States primarily to poor marketing (in the United States, the series was initially broadcast at times which did not suit the target audience – weekdays at 9:00 a. m. and 2:00 pm). Executives connected with Sailor Moon suggest that poor localization played a role. British authors Helen McCarthy and Jonathan Clements go further, calling the dub "indifferent" and suggesting that Sailor Moon was put in "dead" timeslots due to local interests. British distributor MVM Films attributed the low sales to the United Kingdom release being of the dub only, and that major retailers refused to support the show leading to the DVD release appealing to neither children nor older anime fans.

Due to anti-Japanese sentiment, most Japanese media other than anime was banned for several decades in South Korea. A producer in KBS "did not even try to buy" Sailor Moon because the producer thought it would not pass the censorship laws, but by April 1997, Sailor Moon was airing on KBS 2 without issues and was "enormously" popular.

See alsoCandy Candy''

Notes

References

External links

 Official website
 Official website 
 

1992 anime television series debuts
1992 Japanese television series debuts
1997 Japanese television series endings
Animated superheroine television shows
Anime series based on manga
First-run syndicated television programs in the United States
Geneon USA
Japanese children's animated superhero television series
Magical girl anime and manga
Sailor Moon mass media
Teen animated television series
Teen superhero television series
Television censorship in the United States
Television series about princesses
Television series about the Moon
Television shows set in Tokyo
Television series by DIC Entertainment
Toei Animation television
Tokyopop titles
Toonami
TV Asahi original programming
USA Action Extreme Team
Viz Media anime